Shelomo Dov Goitein (April 3, 1900 – February 6, 1985) was a German-Jewish ethnographer, historian and Arabist known for his research on Jewish life in the Islamic Middle Ages, and particularly on the Cairo Geniza.

Biography
Shelomo Dov (Fritz) Goitein was born in the town of Burgkunstadt in Upper Franconia, Germany; his father, Dr. Eduard Goitein, was born in Hungary to a long line of rabbis. The name Goitein points probably to Kojetín in Moravia as the city of origin of the family. He was brought up with both secular and Talmudic education. In 1914 his father died and the family moved to Frankfurt am Main, where he finished high school and university.

During 1918–23 he studied Arabic and Islam at the University of Frankfurt under the guidance of the famous scholar Josef Horovitz, while continuing his Talmudic study with a private teacher. He left the university with a dissertation on prayer in Islam. In the year 1923, Goitein fulfilled his lifelong dream and immigrated together with Gershom Scholem sailing to Palestine, where he stayed for thirty-four years. He lived four years in Haifa until he was invited to lecture at the Hebrew University of Jerusalem, which had been inaugurated two years earlier. In Jerusalem, he married Theresa Gottlieb (1900–1987), a eurhythmics teacher who composed songs and plays for children. They had three children, Ayala Gordon, Ofra, and Elon.

In 1957 he moved to the United States where he felt more able to remain focused on his studies. He settled in Philadelphia and worked at the Institute for Advanced Study in Princeton. He died on February 6, 1985, the day his last volume of the series A Mediterranean Society: The Jewish Communities of the Arab World as Portrayed in the Documents of the Cairo Geniza (vol. 5) was sent to the publisher. The first delivery of The Individual: Portrayt of a Mediterranean Personality of the High Middle Ages as Reflected in the Cairo Geniza had been sent to the California University Press on December 26, 1984.

Academic career
In 1918–23, Goitein attended the universities of Frankfurt and Berlin and studied Islamic history under Josef Horovitz. His Ph.D. thesis was "on prayer in Islam." He also pursued Jewish studies, and was a leader in the Zionist Youth Movement. In 1923 he immigrated to Palestine, where he taught Bible and Hebrew language at the Reali School in Haifa. In 1927 he wrote a play called Pulcellina about the blood libel killings in Blois in 1171. In 1928, he was appointed professor of Islamic History and Islamic Studies at the Hebrew University of Jerusalem. He was founder of the School of Asian and African studies and of the Israel Oriental Society. In 1928, he began his research of the language, culture and history of the Jews of Yemen. In 1949, he did research in Aden, questioning the Jews who gathered there from all parts of Yemen before being flown to Israel. In 1938-1948, he served as a senior education officer in Mandatory Palestine, responsible for Jewish and Arab Schools, and published books on methods of teaching the Bible and Hebrew.

From 1948, Goitein began his life's work on the Cairo Geniza documents. An especially rich geniza with a large volume of correspondence was discovered in Old Cairo containing thousands of documents dating from the 9th to the 13th centuries. Since Jews began every letter or document with the words "With the help of God," the papers reflected all aspects of everyday life in the countries of North Africa and bordering the Mediterranean. The documents included many letters from Jewish traders en route from Tunisia and Egypt to Yemen and ultimately to India. The papers were mostly written in Judeo-Arabic characters. After deciphering the documents, Goitein vividly reconstructed many aspects of Jewish life in the Middle Ages, publishing them in a six-volume monumental series, A Mediterranean Society: The Jewish communities of the Arab World as Portrayed in the Documents of the Cairo Geniza (1967–1993). Although the documents were written by Jews, they reflect the surrounding Muslim and Christian environments not only in countries bordering the Mediterranean but all the way to India. This has thrown new light on the whole study of the Middle Ages.
Goitein consulted extensively the Haskell Isaacs's catalogue of the Wellcome Collection and the Cairo Geniza material, of which he was considered the preeminent scholar.

Agnon correspondence
Goitein's lengthy correspondence with the Nobel Prize-winning author S.Y. Agnon was published by his daughter, Ayala Gordon, in 2008. Agnon's wife, Esther, had studied Arabic privately with Goitein while she was a student at the University of Frankfurt. When Goitein moved to Jerusalem, he and Agnon became close friends. Most of the letters are from the mid-1950s onwards, after Goitein left Israel, a move of which Agnon was highly critical.

Awards and recognition
Goitein was awarded honorary degrees from many universities. He received research awards from Guggenheim (1965), Harvey (1980), and the MacArthur lifetime fellowship (1983). He was an elected member of the American Philosophical Society (1970).

He received the National Jewish Book Award Scholarship for A Mediterranean Society Vol. IV in 1984.

Published works
A Mediterranean Society: The Jewish Communities of the Arab World as Portrayed in the Documents of the Cairo Geniza, Vol. I: Economic Foundations, University of California Press (September 1, 2000), 
A Mediterranean Society: The Jewish Communities of the Arab World as Portrayed in the Documents of the Cairo Geniza, Vol. II: The Community, 1967
A Mediterranean Society: The Jewish Communities of the Arab World as Portrayed in the Documents of the Cairo Geniza, Vol. III: The Family, 
A Mediterranean Society: The Jewish Communities of the Arab World as Portrayed in the Documents of the Cairo Geniza, Vol. IV: Daily Life, 
A Mediterranean Society: The Jewish Communities of the Arab World as Portrayed in the Documents of the Cairo Geniza, Vol. V: The Individual, 
A Mediterranean Society: The Jewish Communities of the Arab World as Portrayed in the Documents of the Cairo Geniza, Vol. VI: Cumulative Indices, 
The Land of Sheba: Tales of the Jews of Yemen, 1947
Religion in a Religious Age, June 1996
Jews and Arabs: Their Contact Through the Ages, 1955
Letters of Medieval Jewish Traders, translated from the Arabic with an introduction and notes, Princeton University Press, 1973, 
Jews and Arabs: A Concise History of Their Social and Cultural Relations (a reprint of Jews and Arabs: Their Contact Through the Ages)
India Traders of the Middle Ages: Documents From the Cairo Geniza, 2008 (also known as "India Book")
The Yemenites – History, Communal Organization, Spiritual Life (Selected Studies), editor: Menahem Ben-Sasson, Jerusalem 1983, 
 Jemenica: Sprichwörter und Redensarten aus Zentral-Jemen / mit zahlreichen Sach- und Worterläuterungen (A collection of c. 1,500 proverbs and sayings from central Yemen), Leipzig 1934

Bibliographies
Two editions of his bibliographies are available:
1. Attal, Robert. A  Bibliography of the writings of Prof. Shelomo Dov Goitein, Israel Oriental society and the Institute of Asian and African Studies, The Hebrew University of Jerusalem, 1975. It includes among other articles  an introduction by Richard Ettinghausen, as well as Goiteins own article:"The Life Story of a Scholar",
547 publications are mentioned.
2. Attal, Robert. A Bibliography of the writings of Prof. Shelomo Dov Goitein, Ben Zvi Institute Jerusalem 2000, an expanded edition containing 737 titles, as well as general Index and Index of Reviews.
3. Udovitch, A.L., Rosenthal, F. and Yerushalmi, Y.H. Shelomo Dov Goitein 1900-1985 Memorial comments, The Institute of Advanced Study Princeton, 1985

References

1900 births
1985 deaths
People from Lichtenfels (district)
German Arabists
German emigrants to Mandatory Palestine
20th-century German Jews
German male non-fiction writers
German orientalists
Israeli emigrants to the United States
Israeli orientalists
Jewish American historians
Jewish orientalists
Fellows of the Medieval Academy of America
MacArthur Fellows
Researchers of Yemenite Jewry
20th-century American Jews
Members of the American Philosophical Society